The list of shipwrecks in December 1826 includes some ships sunk, foundered, grounded, or otherwise lost during December 1826.

1 December

2 December

3 December

4 December

5 December

6 December

7 December

8 December

9 December

10 December

12 December

15 December

16 December

17 December

19 December

20 December

21 December

23 December

24 December

27 December

28 December

31 December

Unknown date

References

1826-12